Giuliano Fortunato (12 May 1940 – 23 September 2022) was an Italian professional footballer who played as a forward. He made 203 appearances and scored 34 goals in Serie A, most notably for Milan and Lazio, during the 1960s and early 1970s.

Honours 
A.C. Milan
 Coppa Italia: 1966–67
 European Cup: 1962–63

Lazio
 Serie B: 1968–69
 Coppa delle Alpi: 1971

References

External links 
Profile at MagliaRossonera.it 
Profile at EmozioneCalcio.it 
Profile at WLecce.it 

1940 births
2022 deaths
Italian footballers
Footballers from Friuli Venezia Giulia
Association football forwards
Serie A players
Serie B players
A.S. Pro Gorizia players
U.S. Triestina Calcio 1918 players
L.R. Vicenza players
A.C. Milan players
S.S. Lazio players
U.S. Lecce players